Mohammed I of Kanem was a mai of Kanem whose reign on the throne was for a brief period of time. He died fighting the Sao of southern Lake Chad. His death and the inability of the sons of Abdullahi I to win the Sao wars led to a suspension of patrilineal succession.

Rulers of the Kanem Empire